Tu2, TU2 or Tu-2 may refer to:

Transportation
 Tupolev Tu-2 Bat, Soviet WWII bomber airplane
 TU2 diesel locomotive, Soviet narrow-gauge diesel locomotive train engine
 Type TU2, a variant of the Hamburg U-Bahn Type A electric multiple unit train
 PSA TU2, a variant of the automotive PSA TU engine

Other uses
 TU2, Ba'ja, Petra, Jordan

See also

 TU (disambiguation)
 tutu (disambiguation)
 Tuu (disambiguation)